Otfried Preußler (sometimes spelled as Otfried Preussler; both ; born Otfried Syrowatka; 20 October 1923 – 18 February 2013) was a German children's books author. More than 50 million copies of his books have been sold worldwide and they have been translated into 55 languages. His best-known works are The Robber Hotzenplotz and The Satanic Mill (Krabat).

Life and work 
He was born in Liberec (Reichenberg), Czechoslovakia. His mother Erna Syrowatka, née Tscherwenka, and his father Josef Syrowatka were both teachers. They changed their family name from the Czech Syrowatka to the German Preußler in 1941 during the Nazi occupation of the country. After he graduated school in 1942, in the midst of World War II, he was drafted into the German Army. Although he survived the military action on the Eastern Front, he was taken prisoner as a 21-year-old lieutenant in 1944. He spent the next five years in various POW camps in the Tatar Republic.

After his release in June 1949, he found his displaced relatives and his fiancée, Annelies Kind in the Bavarian town of Rosenheim. They married that same year.

Between 1953 and 1970, he was initially a primary school teacher, then a school principal in Rosenheim. There his talents as a storyteller and illustrator were put to good use, and often the stories he told the children would later be written down and published.

He won the Deutscher Jugendliteraturpreis in 1972 for Krabat.

Preußler resided in Haidholzen, near Rosenheim.

Over 15.2 million copies of his books have been sold in the German language, and his works have been translated into over 55 other languages.

Having essentially retired from writing stories, which had become his main occupation, he undertook the relation of his experiences as a prisoner in the POW camps; those memoirs are to be published after his death.

Legacy
A Gymnasium (grammar school) is named after him (the "Otfried Preußler Gymnasium Pullach", in Pullach, Bavaria, Germany).
There is also a  Grundschule (primary school) in Bad Soden which bears his name.

On October 20, 2017, Google celebrated his 94th birthday with a Google Doodle.

Known works translated into English 
 The Robber Hotzenplotz, 
 The Satanic Mill/The Curse of the Darkling Mill (originally: Krabat), 
 The Little Witch, 
 The Little Water Sprite, 
 The Little Ghost, 
 The Wise Men of Schilda
 Herbie's Magical Hat
 The Adventures of Strong Vanya,  
 Further Adventures of the Robber Hotzenplotz
 Thomas Scarecrow
 Final Adventures of the Robber Hotzenplotz
 The Green Bronze Bell
 Silly Augustine
 The Tale of the Unicorn,

Filmography 
 (1974)
Krabat – The Sorcerer's Apprentice (1978)
Neues vom Räuber Hotzenplotz (1979)
Malá čarodějnice (1984)
Das kleine Gespenst (1992)
Der Räuber Hotzenplotz (2006)
Krabat (2008)
Das Kleine Gespenst (2013)
 (2018)

References

External links 
 Author's Official Website
Melinda C. Shepherd: Otfried Preussler at Britannica Online 
 www.worldcat.org: List of Preußler's books that have been translated into English

1923 births
2013 deaths
20th-century German writers
German children's writers
German fantasy writers
Commanders Crosses of the Order of Merit of the Federal Republic of Germany
German male writers
Sudeten German people
Naturalized citizens of Germany
Writers from Liberec
German Army officers of World War II
German prisoners of war in World War II held by the Soviet Union
Deutscher Fantasy Preis winners